Adolphe Lamot (born 8 November 1911, date of death unknown) was a Belgian wrestler. He competed in the men's Greco-Roman flyweight at the 1948 Summer Olympics.

References

External links
 

1911 births
Year of death missing
Belgian male sport wrestlers
Olympic wrestlers of Belgium
Wrestlers at the 1948 Summer Olympics
Sportspeople from Brussels